The National Center for Education Statistics (NCES) is the part of the United States Department of Education's Institute of Education Sciences (IES) that collects, analyzes, and publishes statistics on education and public school district finance information in the United States. It also conducts international comparisons of education statistics and provides leadership in developing and promoting the use of standardized terminology and definitions for the collection of those statistics. NCES is a principal agency of the U.S. Federal Statistical System.

History 

The functions of NCES have existed in some form since 1867, when Congress passed legislation providing "That there shall be established at the City of Washington, a department of education, for the purpose of collecting such statistics and facts as shall show the condition and progress of education in the several States and Territories, and of diffusing such information respecting the organization and management of schools and school systems, and methods of teaching, as shall aid the people of the United States in the establishment and maintenance of efficient school systems, and otherwise promote the cause of education throughout the country."

Organizational structure 
The National Center for Education Statistics fulfills a Congressional mandate to collect, collate, analyze, and report complete statistics on the condition of American education; conduct and publish reports; and review and report on education activities internationally.

The structure and activities of the center consist of the following divisions.

Office of the Commissioner 
The Office of the Commissioner sets policy and standards for the center and oversees its operation, thus ensuring that statistical quality and confidentiality are maintained.

Administrative Data Division (ADD) 
Administrative Data Division (ADD) oversees planning, design, operations, statistical analysis, reporting, and dissemination of administrative records data at the elementary, secondary, and postsecondary education levels, and on libraries.

Assessment Division (AD) 
Assessment Division (AD) creates, designs, develops, implements and reports on the National Assessment of Educational Progress at the national level and coordinates assessment and related data collection activities with the states. The staff also conducts a variety of other related education assessment studies.

Sample Surveys Division (SSD) 
Sample Surveys Division (SSD) oversees planning design, operations, statistical analysis reporting, and dissemination of data from sample surveys at all levels of education, including early childhood and adult, and international data, such as High School and Beyond (HS&B). Surveys on vocational and technical education are also included in this division.

Annual Reports and Information Staff (ARIS) 
The Annual Reports and Information Staff (ARIS) prepares analyses that synthesize data on a variety of education topics, and disseminates these analyses through indicator reports, tabular reports, and web tools.

Current publications by ARIS include: 
 Report on the Condition of Education, annual report mandated by the U.S. Congress, produced annually, since 1975, and presented to Congress and The White House.
  Digest of Education Statistics, a compilation of statistical tables covering all levels of education       
 Projections of Education Statistics, a report which provides projections for key education statistics
 Indicators of School Crime and Safety, a report that covers topics on crime and safety in elementary, secondary, and postsecondary education
 Status and Trends in the Education of Racial and Ethnic Groups, a report that profiles current conditions and recent trends in the education of students by racial and ethnic group
 Trends in High School Dropout and Completion Rates in the United States, an annual report that provides trends in high school dropout and completion rates

Current programs of research

Assessment programs 
The National Assessment of Educational Progress, a nationwide assessment of achievement among primary and secondary students
The National Assessment of Adult Literacy (NAAL), a large study performed roughly every decade since 1992
The International Assessments Activities (IAA) coordinates the participation of U.S. adults, students, teachers, principals, and schools in various international studies

Early childhood studies 
 The Early Childhood Longitudinal Study (ECLS)
 Components of the National Household Education Survey (NHES)

Elementary and secondary studies 
 The Beginning Teacher Longitudinal Study (BTLS), a study of a cohort of beginning public school teachers initially interviewed as part of the 2007-08 Schools and Staffing Survey
 The Common Core of Data which annually collects fiscal and non-fiscal data about all public schools, public school districts and state education agencies in the United States
 The School Survey on Crime and Safety
 The National Education Longitudinal Study of 1998 (NELS:88), which began with an 8th grade cohort in 1988, providing trend data about critical transitions experienced by young people as they develop, attend school, and embark on their careers
 The Middle Grades Longitudinal Study of 2017-18 (MGLS:2017), the first longitudinal study of a nationally representative cohort of grade 6 students in the United States
 The Education Longitudinal Study of 2002 (ELS), a longitudinal survey that monitors the transitions of a national sample of tenth graders in 2002 to postsecondary education and the world of work
 The High School Longitudinal Study of 2009 (HSLS), which follows a cohort of more than 25,000 9th graders in 2009 through their high school, postsecondary, and early career experiences, focusing on college decision-making and on math learning based on a new algebra assessment
 The Private School Universe Survey (PSS), which builds an accurate and complete list of private schools to serve as a sampling frame for NCES sample surveys of private schools and to report data on the total number of private schools, teachers, and students in the survey universe
 Components of the National Household Education Survey (NHES)
 The Schools and Staffing Survey (SASS), which collects extensive data on American public and private elementary and secondary schools including teachers, principals, schools, school districts, and library media centers. SASS has been replaced by the National Teacher and Principal Survey (NTPS).

Postsecondary studies 
 The Integrated Postsecondary Education Data System (IPEDS), which collects aggregate institutional data on more than 7,000 postsecondary institutions that participate in Title IV federal student aid programs
 The National Postsecondary Student Aid Study (NPSAS), a nationally representative cross-sectional study of how students and families pay for college
 The Beginning Postsecondary Students Longitudinal Study (BPS), a nationally representative longitudinal study that follows first-time, beginning students for six years after their entry to college and provides information about students' persistence and attainment outcomes
 The Baccalaureate and Beyond Longitudinal Study (B&B), a nationally representative longitudinal study that follows baccalaureate graduates for up to ten years, collecting information on their early labor market experiences and post-baccalaureate training and education

References

External links 
 
 

United States Department of Education agencies
National statistical services
Statistical organizations in the United States
Statistics of education
Federal Statistical System of the United States